The Marina Bay Street Circuit (otherwise known as the Singapore Street Circuit) is a street circuit around Marina Bay, Singapore, encompassing the planning areas of Downtown Core (Turns 4 to 23) and Kallang (Turns 1 to 3). 

It is the venue for the Singapore Grand Prix.

The circuit was designed by KBR, and is a modification of the original one first proposed by Hermann Tilke. The circuit has a FIA Grade 1 license. The circuit holds a unique record of having at least one safety car appearance in every race to date. There has been a total of 23 safety car deployments in thirteen races.

Characteristics

On the day of confirmation of the Singapore Grand Prix in the 2008 Formula One season, a routemap was published. The pit area of the circuit is located in an empty plot of land off Republic Boulevard and beside the Singapore Flyer. A temporary road leads from the pit area and under the Benjamin Sheares Bridge to Republic Boulevard and turns onto Raffles Boulevard. It then proceeds along Nicoll Highway, Stamford Road and Saint Andrew's Road around the Padang, past the City Hall.

The track then goes onto the Anderson Bridge, past the Fullerton Hotel and make a tight left turn to Esplanade Drive beside the Merlion Park. It joins Raffles Avenue and cuts right after the Esplanade to the front of The Float @ Marina Bay, then returning to the pit area via a second temporary road around the Singapore Flyer. The track layout is unique in that in between turns 18 and 19, the cars race underneath a section of grandstand of the Floating Platform.

The track was widely criticised by F1 drivers for being excessively bumpy, particularly on Raffles Boulevard between turns 5 and 7, resulting in a very unforgiving circuit, especially given the hot and humid conditions of the Singapore climate. 2008 World Champion Lewis Hamilton commented that it was twice as hard to negotiate as the more famous Monaco street circuit and unexpectedly physical – requiring double the amount of energy over a single lap as compared to the Monaco circuit.

Several drivers, including Sébastien Bourdais and Fernando Alonso, expressed their concern about the high and harsh kerbs at the chicane at turn 10 of the street circuit. Ferrari's Felipe Massa compared the kerbs akin to "little tortoises that would wreck the car if you get something wrong". The drivers were worried that hitting the bumps could cause suspension damage or even damage a tub. They also raised concerns that the bumps would pitch them into the wall on the outside of the corner. Whilst the FIA had been involved in the development of these kerbs, in response to the drivers' concerns FIA race director and safety delegate Charlie Whiting agreed to lower the kerbs at the turn 10 chicane ahead of Friday's free practice. The kerbs were further reduced in height for Saturday's qualifying round and Sunday's race. The chicane at Turn 10 was reprofiled for the 2010 race in an attempt to make it safer and the turns more gradual by moving the kerbs, however Lewis Hamilton said in an interview this modification made the chicane more dangerous by making the entry to the corner smaller, calling the complex "the worst corner in F1". In 2013, ahead of the race, the chicane was removed and replaced with a left turn, resulting in faster lap times.

The entry of the pit lane, which begins at the penultimate corner of the 23-turn layout, was deemed to be "difficult and incredibly dangerous" by several drivers due to the fast nature of the corners where they were situated. The problem was deemed to be primarily due to the speed differential of those entering the pits and those continuing on another lap and their sharing of the same race line. The controversial pit entry at Singapore was then modified ahead of Saturday's qualifying round by extending the pit entry line away from the pits. This change compelled drivers to commit to the pit entry earlier, providing additional warning to those following behind.
In March 2009, three of the circuit's corners were given names after a competition amongst local F1 fans to submit ideas. Turn 1 was named Sheares after Benjamin Henry Sheares, the second president of Singapore; Turn 7 was named Memorial due to its proximity to a Second World War civilian memorial; and Turn 10 was named Singapore Sling. The Singapore Sling was changed for the 2013 Grand Prix and Turn 10 is now a flowing left-hander. Drivers have commented that without the Singapore Sling chicane, the track is much more manageable.

In January 2010, it was reported that race organisers were considering changes to the circuit for the  season. No major changes were made to the layout for the 2011 race, however Singapore Tourism Board has sought submissions on opportunities to reinvigorate the layout or completely relocate it in the future.

For the 2013 season, the FIA approved of track configuration changes. The Turn 10 chicane, known as 'Singapore Sling', was removed and replaced with a single-apex left-hand bend. As a safety measure to compensate for the higher speeds, an extra layer of TecPro barriers were added to the end of the Turn 10 run-off.

In 2015, the FIA approved minor changes to the layout of the Marina Bay Street Circuit ahead of the 2015 Singapore Grand Prix. The modifications run from Turn 11 to Turn 13; drivers will still turn right at Turn 11 but it will now kink left slightly on entry, with the track shifting to the left-hand side of Fullerton Road. This will change the profile of Turn 12, as drivers will now use the other side of the Anderson Bridge, while the hairpin at Turn 13 has been widened by a metre in order to increase overtaking opportunities.

The circuit was expected to receive another re-profile from the 2022 Singapore Grand Prix. In August 2020, Singapore Prime Minister Lee Hsien Loong announced plans to redevelop the Marina Bay Floating Platform into a community space centred on the city-state's policy of National Service. The floating platform has housed the Turn 16–19 series of corners since the circuit's inception in 2008 and is expected to make way for the construction of NS Square in 2022. This re-profiling was not made in 2022, but it will be made before the 2023 Singapore Grand Prix, as the official ticket sale page showed the new circuit layout map. It is expected that the temporary layout change will drop F1 lap times by about 20 seconds.

In June 2022 started the works to upgrade most of the circuit's asphalt, in view to ease the porpoising effect on the 2022 cars.

For the purpose of the night race, approximately 1600 custom-made floodlights are spread around the  Marina Bay circuit. The lights, four times brighter than at a regular sports stadium, are specially designed to minimize glare and surface reflection, and to meet F1's TV broadcasting standards.

A lap in a Formula One car

Marina Bay Street Circuit starts with a specially made pit straight with the first DRS zone. The opening sequence of turns one, two, and three are shaped like an 'S', a curve to the right for turn two, while turn three is to the left at just .

Turns eleven, twelve, and thirteen were reprofiled before the 2015 Singapore Grand Prix. Drivers still turn right at turn eleven, but it will now kink left slightly on entry, with the track shifting to the left-hand side of Fullerton Road.

Turn 14 almost meets turn eight, diverting to the right at  onto the Raffles Avenue (in front of Esplanade). Next, a series of mostly blind corners from turn 15 to 19. At turn 18, cars must turn in at a specific angle, otherwise will brush or crash along the wall. Turn 20 and 21 is just after Bayfront Avenue; a right-hand turn 20, then a left-hand turn 21 that leads the car towards turn 22. How fast the cars approach turn 22 is determined by the exit of turn 21, therefore most of the drivers exit turn 21 very close to the wall to gain a speed advantage.

Layout history

Lap records

Official lap records are set in a race, although qualifying laps are typically faster. The fastest qualifying lap was 1:36.015, set by Lewis Hamilton in 2018 Singapore Grand Prix. The official race lap records at the Marina Bay Street Circuit are listed as:

Gallery

References

External links

 Map and circuit history at RacingCircuits.info
 BBC's circuit guide
 Google Maps hybrid view of the circuit
 Circuit simulation preview with commentary by Mark Webber
 Marina Bay Street Circuit on Google Maps (Current Formula 1 Tracks)

Motorsport venues in Singapore
Formula One circuits
Downtown Core (Singapore)
Kallang
Marina Bay, Singapore
Marina Centre
Singapore Grand Prix